Donald Gilchrist Trelford (9 November 1937 – 27 January 2023) was a British journalist and academic who was editor of The Observer newspaper from 1975 to 1993.  He was also a director of The Observer from 1975 to 1993 and chief executive from 1992 to 1993.

Early life
Trelford was born in Coventry. He was educated at Bablake School, Coventry, where he was school captain from 1955 to 1956. He completed his degree at Selwyn College, Cambridge.

Career
In 1994, he was appointed professor of Journalism Studies at the University of Sheffield, and became a visiting professor in 2004 and emeritus professor in 2007.

Trelford was a member of the Council of the Advertising Standards Authority until 2008 and chairman of the London Press Club.  He was also a member of the Newspaper Panel of the Competition Commission from 2001 to 2007.

Trelford was a regular broadcaster and published books on snooker and cricket and co-authored (with Daniel King) a book on the 1993 Times World Chess Championship in London between Nigel Short and Garry Kasparov.

Trelford was interviewed by National Life Stories (C467/12) in 2007 for the 'Oral History of the British Press' collection held by the British Library.

Personal life and death
Trelford had three marriages and six children. He had three children from his first marriage, to Jan Ingram, whom he married in or around 1963. He had another child from his second marriage, to Katherine Mark. In 2001, he married former television presenter Claire Bishop, and they had children in 2011 and 2014, when Trelford was 73 and 76. He lived in England and Mallorca.

Trelford died from cancer in Mallorca on 27 January 2023, at the age of 85.

References

1937 births
2023 deaths
20th-century British journalists
Academics of the University of Sheffield
Alumni of Selwyn College, Cambridge
British expatriates in Spain
British male journalists
British newspaper editors
Deaths from cancer in Spain
People educated at Bablake School
People from Coventry
The Observer people